Hartsville Community Center-Hartsville Community Market is a historic community center and public market complex located at Hartsville, Darlington County, South Carolina.  It was built in 1935-1936 utilizing federal loans from the Public Works Administration. The Hartsville Community Center is a two-story, five-bay, rectangular plan Art Deco style brick building with a flat roof, parapet, and decorative cast-stone trim.

It was listed on the National Register of Historic Places in 1997.

References

Public Works Administration in South Carolina
Government buildings on the National Register of Historic Places in South Carolina
Art Deco architecture in South Carolina
Government buildings completed in 1936
Buildings and structures in Hartsville, South Carolina
National Register of Historic Places in Darlington County, South Carolina